Parastemon urophyllus is a tree in the family Chrysobalanaceae. The specific epithet  is from the Greek meaning "tail leaf", referring to how the leaf tapers to a sharp point.

Description
The brownish bark is smooth. The timber is a heavy hardwood used in construction and as firewood.

Distribution and habitat
Parastemon urophyllus grows naturally in the Nicobar Islands, Thailand and western Malesia. Its habitat is peat swamp, kerangas and secondary forests.

References

Chrysobalanaceae
Flora of the Nicobar Islands
Trees of Thailand
Trees of Sumatra
Trees of Peninsular Malaysia
Trees of Borneo
Taxonomy articles created by Polbot
Taxobox binomials not recognized by IUCN